Milesia fissipennis is a species of hoverfly in the family Syrphidae.

Distribution
Taiwan.

References

Insects described in 1911
Eristalinae
Diptera of Asia
Taxa named by Paul Gustav Eduard Speiser